Anden or Anda is a small island in the municipality of Øksnes in Nordland county, Norway. It is home to the Anda Lighthouse, which was the last lighthouse in Norway to be automated (in 1987).

Environment
The  island is protected as a nature reserve, and is an important nesting area for Atlantic puffin.  Black-legged kittiwakes, razorbills, common shags, herring gulls, and black guillemots also nest there. The island has been designated an Important Bird Area (IBA) by BirdLife International (BLI). 
There is a large seal colony on the island.

References

Øksnes
Islands of Nordland
Nature reserves in Norway
Ramsar sites in Norway
Important Bird Areas of Norway
Important Bird Areas of Arctic islands
Seabird colonies
Protected areas of Nordland
Vesterålen